Oriental Orthodoxy is the second largest Christian denomination in Iraq after the collective Eastern Catholic Churches. It includes the Syriac Orthodox Church, headed by a patriarch in Damascus, and the Armenian Apostolic Church, which serves the population of Armenians in Iraq. A sizable population have fled from Iraq following the US invasion and subsequent conflicts. Most Oriental Orthodox Christians are of ethnic Iraqi-Assyrian heritage, who make up about 500,000. The other significant minority of Oriental Orthodox Christians are ethnic Armenians. Christians are present in Baghdad, Basra, Mosul and northern Iraq.

History

The early history of Oriental Orthodoxy on the territory of modern-day Iraq was marked by constant Byzantine-Sasanian wars during the period between 5th and 7th century. In that period, major part of the Mesopotamia region was ruled by the Sassanian Empire (Persia). Since official Persian religion was Zoroastrianism, all Christian communities in the region were under constant pressure, and suffered occasional persecutions. Also, relations between different Christian communities was marked by frequent theological disputes and constant rivalry.

During that time, Oriental Orthodox Christians in the region kept their traditional ties with the Syriac Orthodox Patriarchate of Antioch. In order to consolidate ecclesiastical structure of Oriental Orthodox churches within the Sassanian Empire, the Patriarchate decided to appoint theologian Marutha of Tikrit as metropolitan over all Oriental Orthodox dioceses in the Empire (629), granting him the title of maphrian.

Oriental Orthodox Dioceses and Churches in Iraq 
There are 3 dioceses belong to the Syriac Orthodox Church, 1 diocese belongs to the Armenian Apostolic Orthodox Church, and some churches belong to the Coptic Orthodox Archdiocese of Jerusalem.

 Syrian Orthodox Archbishopric of Mosul, Kirkuk and Kurdistan under the spiritual guidance and direction of Archbishop Nicodimus Dawood Sharaf.
 Syrian Orthodox Archbishopric of Baghdad and Basrah under the spiritual guidance and direction of Archbishop Severius Jamil Hawa
 Syrian Orthodox Archbishopric of St Matthew's Monastery under the spiritual guidance and direction of Archbishop Timothius Mousa Shamani.
 Armenian Orthodox Diocese of Iraq under the spiritual guidance and direction of Bishop Oshakan Kulkolian.
 Coptic Orthodox Churches belongs to the Coptic Orthodox Archdiocese of Jerusalem, under the spiritual guidance and direction of Archbishop Antonios.

See also
 Christianity in Iraq
 Eastern Orthodoxy in Iraq
 Persecution of Christians in Iraq
 Human rights in Iraq
 Freedom of religion in Iraq

References

Sources

External links
 European Centre for Law and Justice (2011): The Persecution of Oriental Christians, what answer from Europe?